The 2020 Holy Cross Crusaders football team represented the College of the Holy Cross in the 2020–21 NCAA Division I FCS football season. The Crusaders, led by third-year head coach Bob Chesney, played their home games at Fitton Field as a member of the Patriot League.

On July 13, 2020, the Patriot League announced that it would cancel its fall sports seasons due to the COVID-19 pandemic. The league announced a spring schedule on February 5, with the first games set to be played on March 13.

Schedule
Holy Cross had game scheduled against Yale on September 19, Harvard on October 3, and Brown on October 10, which were all later canceled before the start of the 2020 season.

References

Holy Cross
Holy Cross Crusaders football seasons
Patriot League football champion seasons
Holy Cross
Holy Cross Crusaders football